Pedro Felipe Figueredo, (born 18 February 1818 – 17 August 1870), mostly known as Perucho, was a Cuban poet, musician, and freedom fighter of the 19th century. In the 1860s, he was active in the planning of the Cuban uprising against the Spanish known as the Ten Years' War.

Figueredo was born in Bayamo, Cuba. He wrote the Cuban national anthem, El Himno de Bayamo, in 1867. He was captured during the war and executed on 17 August 1870 in Santiago de Cuba.

His daughter Candelaria Figueredo became a hero of the uprising by carrying the new independent Cuban flag into battle at Bayamo in 1868.

External links

Perucho site Learn about his heroic life and the lives of his family.
Himno Bayamés (Letra y música de Pedro Figueredo.) Coleccion arreglada para canto y piano. Arro. no. 2. Por el maestro J. Marin Varona. From Sibley Music Library Digital Scores Collection

People from Bayamo
1818 births
1870 deaths
People of the Ten Years' War
National anthem writers
Cuban composers
Male composers
19th-century Cuban poets
Cuban male poets
19th-century Cuban people
Cuban nationalists
People executed by Spain by firing squad
Executed Cuban people
Cuban male musicians